The 6th constituency of Bouches-du-Rhône is a French legislative constituency in Bouches-du-Rhône.

Deputies

Elections

2022

 
 
 
 
 
 
 
 
|-
| colspan="8" bgcolor="#E9E9E9"|
|-

2017

2012

|- style="background-color:#E9E9E9;text-align:center;"
! colspan="2" rowspan="2" style="text-align:left;" | Candidate
! rowspan="2" colspan="2" style="text-align:left;" | Party
! colspan="2" | 1st round
! colspan="2" | 2nd round
|- style="background-color:#E9E9E9;text-align:center;"
! width="75" | Votes
! width="30" | %
! width="75" | Votes
! width="30" | %
|-
| style="background-color:" |
| style="text-align:left;" | Guy Teissier
| style="text-align:left;" | Union for a Popular Movement
| UMP
| 
| 37.06%
| 
| 42.45%
|-
| style="background-color:" |
| style="text-align:left;" | Pierre Semeriva
| style="text-align:left;" | Europe Ecology – The Greens
| EELV
| 
| 27.10%
| 
| 37.46%
|-
| style="background-color:" |
| style="text-align:left;" | Laurent Comas
| style="text-align:left;" | Front National
| FN
| 
| 22.68%
| 
| 20.08%
|-
| style="background-color:" |
| style="text-align:left;" | Anna Rosso Roig
| style="text-align:left;" | Left Front
| FG
| 
| 7.08%
| colspan="2" style="text-align:left;" |
|-
| style="background-color:" |
| style="text-align:left;" | Cédric Matthews
| style="text-align:left;" | Miscellaneous Left
| DVG
| 
| 1.73%
| colspan="2" style="text-align:left;" |
|-
| style="background-color:" |
| style="text-align:left;" | Patrick Filosa
| style="text-align:left;" | 
| CEN
| 
| 1.31%
| colspan="2" style="text-align:left;" |
|-
| style="background-color:" |
| style="text-align:left;" | Eric Talles
| style="text-align:left;" | Ecologist
| ECO
| 
| 0.99%
| colspan="2" style="text-align:left;" |
|-
| style="background-color:" |
| style="text-align:left;" | Dominique Esteve-Narsisyan
| style="text-align:left;" | Ecologist
| ECO
| 
| 0.61%
| colspan="2" style="text-align:left;" |
|-
| style="background-color:" |
| style="text-align:left;" | Patrick Placente
| style="text-align:left;" | Other
| AUT
| 
| 0.49%
| colspan="2" style="text-align:left;" |
|-
| style="background-color:" |
| style="text-align:left;" | Stéphanie Brun-Pothin
| style="text-align:left;" | Miscellaneous Right
| DVD
| 
| 0.42%
| colspan="2" style="text-align:left;" |
|-
| style="background-color:" |
| style="text-align:left;" | David Larriven
| style="text-align:left;" | Far Left
| EXG
| 
| 0.28%
| colspan="2" style="text-align:left;" |
|-
| style="background-color:" |
| style="text-align:left;" | Jacqueline Grandel
| style="text-align:left;" | Far Left
| EXG
| 
| 0.25%
| colspan="2" style="text-align:left;" |
|-
| style="background-color:" |
| style="text-align:left;" | Michel Villeneuve
| style="text-align:left;" | Radical Party of the Left
| PRG
| 
| 0.00%
| colspan="2" style="text-align:left;" |
|-
| colspan="8" style="background-color:#E9E9E9;"|
|- style="font-weight:bold"
| colspan="4" style="text-align:left;" | Total
| 
| 100%
| 
| 100%
|-
| colspan="8" style="background-color:#E9E9E9;"|
|-
| colspan="4" style="text-align:left;" | Registered voters
| 
| style="background-color:#E9E9E9;"|
| 
| style="background-color:#E9E9E9;"|
|-
| colspan="4" style="text-align:left;" | Blank/Void ballots
| 
| 0.94%
| 
| 1.04%
|-
| colspan="4" style="text-align:left;" | Turnout
| 
| 56.54%
| 
| 56.10%
|-
| colspan="4" style="text-align:left;" | Abstentions
| 
| 43.46%
| 
| 43.90%
|-
| colspan="8" style="background-color:#E9E9E9;"|
|- style="font-weight:bold"
| colspan="6" style="text-align:left;" | Result
| colspan="2" style="background-color:" | UMP HOLD
|}

2007

2002

 
 
 
 
 
|-
| colspan="8" bgcolor="#E9E9E9"|
|-

1997

 
 
 
 
 
 
|-
| colspan="8" bgcolor="#E9E9E9"|
|-

References

6